Shifen Waterfall is a scenic waterfall located  in Pingxi District, New Taipei City, Taiwan, on the upper reaches of the Keelung River. It is a cascade waterfall in which the water flows in one direction and the rock is sloped in the opposite.

Name
The name Shifen was taken from the 10 original families who develop the area in Pingxi. The waterfall also is nicknamed the Little Niagara of Taiwan.

Geology
The riverbed of the waterfall consists of several potholes which was caused by the uneven flow of the river, thus creating vortexes that traps passing rocks and causing them to spin and carve holes.

Access
The waterfall is at about 2 km northeast of Shifen station of Taiwan Railways.

The land surrounding the waterfall was private land for a long time and a private company collected entrance fees from the visitors. In 2014, New Taipei city's Tourism and Travel Department acquired the land around the waterfall and created a municipal park and made the admission to the park free. 

During the summer from June 1 to Sep 30, the park's opening hours are 9 a.m. to 6 p.m., and the latest time for visitors to enter the park is 5:30 p.m. During the rest of the year from Oct 1 to May 31, opening hours are 9 a.m. to 5 p.m., and the latest time for visitors to enter the park is 4:30 p.m.

See also
 List of tourist attractions in Taiwan

References

External links

 Shifen waterfall of New Taipei City, Taiwan
 Shifen Scenic Area
 Video of Shifen Waterfall

Waterfalls of New Taipei